This list of high schools in the state of Connecticut is a sortable table. To sort alphabetically by the subject of each column, click on the triangles in each column heading. A second click reorders the list in reverse alphabetical order by that column. The default order for the list is alphabetically by community name.

School names are listed with the full, official name of the school without beginning articles such as 'the' to allow the below table to be sorted appropriately. Some schools named after people are sometimes known by the last name of the person (such as "O'Brien Tech", for instance Emmett O'Brien Technical High School).

See also
List of school districts in Connecticut

Notes

External links
List of high schools in Connecticut from SchoolTree.org

Connecticut
High schools
Sports in Connecticut
High school sports conferences and leagues in the United States